Eupatoria may refer to:

 Eupatoria or Yevpatoria, a city of Crimea
 the Battle of Eupatoria, 1855
 Eupatoria (Pontus), an ancient city of Pontus
 Agrimonia eupatoria, common agrimony